Alexander Shamil'evich Melik-Pashayev (23 October 1905, in Tbilisi – 18 June 1964), PAU, was a Soviet-Armenian conductor. He made numerous highly regarded recordings with Melodiya from the 1940s to the 1960s, including memorable versions of Boris Godunov, War and Peace and The Queen of Spades.

External links

Biography
"Musical Portrait"

1905 births
1964 deaths
Musicians from Tbilisi
People from Tiflis Governorate
Russian people of Armenian descent
Georgian people of Armenian descent
Armenian conductors (music)
Soviet conductors (music)
20th-century Russian conductors (music)
Russian male conductors (music)
20th-century Russian male musicians